Glloboçica (Serbian: Globočica / Глобочица) is a settlement in south Kosovo on the border with North Macedonia. It contains a border crossing on the main road from Tetovo to Pristina.

Notes

References

Villages in Kaçanik
Kosovo–North Macedonia border crossings